El Metro Transit is the operator of public transportation in Laredo, Texas. Twenty-three bus routes are operated in a hub and spoke system, with each terminating in a downtown transit center. Most routes function seven days per week.

Fleet

Route list
The following is El Metro Transit route list:
1 Santa Maria
2A San Bernardo/Mall Del Norte
2B San Bernardo/Calton
3 Covenant
4 Springfield
5 Tilden
6 Cedar
7 LCC
8A Guadalupe/Lane
8B Guadalupe/Via del Sol
9 Market
10 Corpus Christi
11 Gustavus/Lea
12A Del Mar Express
12B Shiloh Express
13 Heritage Park
14 Santa Rita
15 Main/Riverside
16 TAMIU Campus
17 Mines Rd
18 Hop n Shop Trolley
19 Santo Niño
20 Los Angeles
21 Google Services

References

Bus transportation in Texas
Transportation in Webb County, Texas
Transportation in Laredo, Texas